Richard Martel  (born March 23, 1961) is a Canadian politician and former ice hockey coach. He last coached the Grenoble Brûleurs de Loups in the French Ligue Magnus. Martel was elected to the House of Commons of Canada in a by-election on June 18, 2018. He represents the electoral district of Chicoutimi—Le Fjord as a member of the Conservative Party of Canada.

Coaching career
Martel was an assistant coach under Jos Canale from 1991 to 1993 in Chicoutimi. Between 1993 and 2011, Martel served as a head coach in the Quebec Major Junior Hockey League (QMJHL) where he twice won the Ron Lapointe Trophy as the QMJHL coach of the year. On February 28, 2010, Martel became the most successful coach in the history of the QMJHL when he coached the Chicoutimi Saguenéens to a 3–1 victory over the Baie-Comeau Drakkar to win his 570th QMJHL game, surpassing the record previously held by Guy Chouinard.

Coaching record

QMJHL

Source: Career profile

Awards and honours

Politics

On December 20, 2017, Martel was named the Conservative candidate for an upcoming by-election in the federal electoral district of Chicoutimi—Le Fjord, as a star candidate. Martel was recruited by a former player, Antoine Tardif, who served as the party's chief organizer in Quebec. Martel had previously been courted to run for mayor of Saguenay as well as the National Assembly of Quebec.

Martel was elected as a Member of Parliament on June 18, 2018, gaining the seat from the Liberals.

He was reelected in the 2019 Canadian federal election.

On September 2, 2020, Conservative leader Erin O'Toole announced that Martel would serve as the party's Quebec lieutenant, succeeding Alain Rayes. Martel served in the role until November 8, 2021, when he was succeeded by Rayes.

Electoral record

References

External links

Richard Martel's staff ptofile at Eliteprospects.com

1961 births
21st-century Canadian politicians
Baie-Comeau Drakkar coaches
Canadian ice hockey coaches
Canadian sportsperson-politicians
Chicoutimi Saguenéens coaches
Conservative Party of Canada MPs
French Quebecers
Ice hockey people from Quebec
Living people
Members of the House of Commons of Canada from Quebec
Politicians from Saguenay, Quebec
Saint-Hyacinthe Laser coaches
Sportspeople from Saguenay, Quebec
Val-d'Or Foreurs coaches